This is a list of yearly Kansas Collegiate Athletic Conference football standings.

Kansas Collegiate Athletic Conference standings

References

Kansas Collegiate Athletic Conference
Standings